Earl Le Noir Packer (November 19, 1894 – December 26, 1993) served as the first United States Chargé d'Affaires ad interim to Burma from September 19, 1947, when Embassy Rangoon was established, to October 17, 1947.

External links
 https://web.archive.org/web/20021117075817/http://www.state.gov/r/pa/ho/po/com/10404.htm

Ambassadors of the United States to Latvia
1894 births
1993 deaths
Ambassadors of the United States to Myanmar